Jingshanosaurus (meaning "Jingshan lizard") is a genus of sauropodomorph dinosaurs from the early Jurassic period 201.3 million years ago that went extinct 199.3 million years ago in the Hettangian Age.

Its maximum weight was around 4.3 t with an adult femur length of 845 mm. Jingshanosaurus xinwaensis grew to be 5 meters (16.4 ft) long.

History of discovery

Its fossils, a nearly complete skeleton including the skull, were found near the town of Jingshan ("Golden Hill"), Lufeng County, Yunnan Province, China, from which the name derives. First described in 1995, the type species is J. xinwaensis, formalized by Zhang and Yang.  Fossil remains of Jingshanosaurus had been exhibited in museums several years prior to the formal naming. A complete skeleton and skull of Jingshanosaurus xinwaensis have been found and is considered the last prosauropods to live on earth.

Classification
Jingshanosaurus may have been most closely related to Yunnanosaurus, and has, at times, been included in the Yunnanosauridae. In fact, Dong Zhiming considered Jingshanosaurus possibly a large specimen of Yunnanosaurus. If true, this would make Jingshanosaurus a junior synonym of Yunnanosaurus.

References

Massopoda
Early Jurassic dinosaurs of Asia
Taxa named by Dong Zhiming
Fossil taxa described in 1995
Paleontology in Yunnan